HMIS Bengal (J243) was a  of the Royal Indian Navy (RIN) which served during the Second World War.

History
HMIS Bengal was ordered from Cockatoo Docks and Engineering Company, Australia, for the Royal Indian Navy in 1940. She was commissioned into the RIN in 1942.

Operations in the Second World War
HMIS Bengal was a part of the Eastern Fleet during the Second World War and escorted numerous convoys between 1942 and 1945.

On 11 November 1942, Bengal was escorting the Dutch tanker  to the southwest of Cocos Islands in the Indian Ocean. Two Japanese commerce raiders armed with  guns attacked Ondina. Both Ondina and Bengal ran out of ammunition. Ondina was badly damaged by shellfire and torpedoes, and her captain signaled "abandon ship" before he died. Bengal, seeing there was nothing more she could do, sailed away.  

The other raider, machine-gunned the lifeboats with Ondinas crew aboard, causing some casualties, picked up the survivors from Hōkoku Maru  and sailed off, believing that Ondina was sinking. Ondinas surviving crew re-boarded their ship, put out the fires and sailed to Freemantle. Bengal, too, reached port safely.

Notes

References
 

Bathurst-class corvettes of the Royal Indian Navy
1942 ships